The HTC Flyer (also known as the HTC EVO View 4G) is a tablet computer by HTC Corporation. It was announced at the Mobile World Congress (MWC) 2011 and released in May 2011. Unlike other tablets announced at MWC, the Flyer has a single-core 1.5 GHz CPU and ran 2.3.3 (Gingerbread). In February 2011 it was reported that HTC had claimed via Facebook that "Flyer will be getting a Honeycomb upgrade in Q2", however an HTC representative subsequently stated "I can confirm that we are working to bring a Honeycomb update to Flyer in short order – however, I don't have any specific information on what the timing may be." The version running Android 3.2 Honeycomb was released later in 2011. The HTC Flyer can be updated up to Android 4.1.2 Jelly Bean through the use of custom ROMs.

It has a 7-inch TFT display and includes some special features, such as pen input as well as touch input. A Wi-Fi variant was launched on May 22 and it was available via Best Buy. The product was discontinued in December 2011.

Key features 

 An optional HTC Scribe digital pen using HTC Scribe technology running on top of N-trig DuoSense hardware, by which a user can capture and annotate any on-screen content with notes and drawings using a battery-powered, active, non-capacitive digital stylus.
 7" 1024×600 display with multi-touch capability
 Integration and compatibility with Wi-Fi and Bluetooth 3.0
 Built-in dual microphones for noise reduction
 Android operating system
 Adobe Flash 10.3 and HTML5 support

Hardware 
 5 MP Color CMOS camera with auto focus
 1.3 MP front camera for video chatting
 32GB eMMC memory plus microSD card slot
 4,000 mAh battery

"The HTC Flyer features an immersive 3D user experience that brings to life, all your favorite content - weather, email and even ebooks." Best Buy was the exclusive retailer for the spring 2011 launch.

References

Tablet computers
Android (operating system) devices
HTC Corporation
Tablet computers introduced in 2011